John Bosco Manat Chuabsamai (31 October 1935 – 20 October 2011) was the Catholic bishop of Ratchaburi from 1986 to 2003.

Manat was born on 31 October 1935 in Bang Nok Khwaek. He was sent to study philosophy and theology in Madras, India, and was then ordained a priest on 10 May 1961. After ordination he worked in parish, school, and seminary posts in the diocese of Ratchaburi. In 1976/77 he studied at The Catholic University of America in Washington, D.C., from which he obtained a master's degree in philosophy. He then taught philosophy at the Lux Mundi seminary, the only major seminary in Thailand. In 1984 he became rector of the seminary.

On 25 November 1985 Manat was appointed bishop of Ratchaburi in succession to the late Joseph Ek Thabping. On 6 January 1986 he was consecrated bishop by Pope John Paul II in Rome.

In May 1993 during a visit to Manila in the Philippines, Manat came into contact with the Society of Saint Pius X. In April 2000 he met with the Superior General of the Society, Bishop Bernard Fellay. In 2001 he visited many of the Society's chapels in the United States.  He resigned as bishop of Ratchaburi on 24 July 2003.

References

External links 
Interview in The Angelus, November 2001, Volume XXIV, Number 11

21st-century Roman Catholic bishops in Thailand
1935 births
2011 deaths
Catholic University of America alumni
20th-century Roman Catholic bishops in Thailand